The Serbia men's national basketball team represents Serbia in international basketball competition and is controlled by the Basketball Federation of Serbia. Serbia is currently ranked sixth in the FIBA World Rankings.

From 1992 to 2003, the national team played under the name of FR Yugoslavia and from 2003 to 2006, under the name of Serbia and Montenegro in international tournaments. Following the Montenegrin declaration of independence in 2006, Basketball Federation of Serbia retained the place of Basketball Federation of Serbia and Montenegro as a FIBA member. Therefore, all the results and medals from this period are succeeded by the Serbia national team.

History

Serbia and Montenegro
With the start of Yugoslav Wars in 1991, and subsequent breakup of Yugoslavia, the Yugoslavia national team was disbanded. The team consisted of players selected from the population of over 23 million people, and the basketball infrastructure was evenly distributed among the six states which formed the Socialist Federal Republic of Yugoslavia.

In 1992, FR Yugoslavia was established as the federation of the two remaining Yugoslav republics, Serbia and Montenegro. The newly established country had less than half the population of the former country. The Basketball Federation of FR Yugoslavia became the governing body of basketball for the new country. After the adoption of UNSCR 757, the national team was suspended from participating in international tournaments. Due to these sanctions and ongoing war, the national team was prevented from participating at the 1992 Summer Olympics, EuroBasket 1993 and 1994 FIBA World Cup.

1995–2002: Golden generation
Without much sponsorship for the war-impoverished country, the national team made its comeback to the international scene at the EuroBasket 1995 in Greece, where it won the gold medal; after defeating Lithuania in the final. At the 1996 Summer Olympics, the team lost 69–95 to the United States in the gold-medal game. After the defeat, the national team would go on to claim the gold medal in their next two international competitions, EuroBasket 1997 and the 1998 FIBA World Cup; while winning the bronze medal at EuroBasket 1999 and reclaiming gold once again at the EuroBasket 2001.

One of the most notable wins for the Yugoslavia national team came in the quarter-finals of the 2002 FIBA World Cup, where the host nation of the tournament, the United States was eliminated 81–78. The significance of the win was tremendous for the Serbian people in general, as the public in Serbia perceived the United States political leadership responsible for the breakup of Yugoslavia, and destruction of the country's infrastructure; as well as civil victims during the 1999 NATO bombing of Yugoslavia. Thereafter, the Yugoslavia national team went on to win the competition, by defeating New Zealand in the semi-finals and Argentina in the final 84–77 in OT to win the gold medal.

2003–2006: Underwhelming results
In 2002, FR Yugoslavia consisted of the states of Serbia and Montenegro. The merged nations came to a new agreement regarding continued co-operation, which, among other changes, promised the end of the name Yugoslavia. On 4 February 2003, the federal assembly of Yugoslavia created a loose state union—the State Union of Serbia and Montenegro. The following years were underwhelming as the national team failed to make the podium at international tournaments, after decades of winning medals.

At the EuroBasket 2003, the team came in sixth place, but due to their world champion status, were automatically qualified for the 2004 Summer Olympics in Greece. 
Entering 2004, the national team participated in the less important Diamond Ball tournament, prior to the 2004 Olympic Games where they won the gold medal. Although the team was unable to carry over the momentum heading into the Olympics, and were eliminated in the group stage with a (1–4) record, finishing in 11th place.

After two consecutive tournament disappointments, hopes of getting back on the podium returned for the EuroBasket 2005 where Serbia and Montenegro was the host nation. Heading into the tournament, Željko Obradović was brought back for a second stint as head coach of the national team. However, they were eliminated in the play-off stage by France 74–71, and finished in ninth place. After the tournament, Obradović stepped down, and blamed a bad atmosphere among the team's star players for the failure. The team then participated at the 2006 FIBA World Cup on a wild card, due to the results in the past on the initiative by FIBA prominent administrator Borislav Stanković. Although the national team of Serbia and Montenegro came up short once again, with another ninth place finish.

On 21 May 2006, Montenegrins voted in an independence referendum, with 55.5% supporting independence. The subsequent Montenegrin proclamation of independence in June 2006 and the Serbian proclamation of independence on 5 June ended the State Union of Serbia and Montenegro and thus the last remaining vestiges of the former Yugoslavia.

Serbia
Following the dissolution of the state union of Serbia and Montenegro, the national team participated at the EuroBasket 2007. There, the team finished the competition failing to make it out of the group stage after three close losses. The result failed to qualify the team for the 2008 Summer Olympics, which was their first time missing the Olympic tournament after missing it in 1992 due to suspension.  

In December 2007, the legendary Dušan Ivković hinted that he would take the helm as head coach of the national team.

2009–2013: Flashes of old glory
Under Ivković's coaching, a new generation of players led by Nenad Krstić and Miloš Teodosić returned some of the old glory by taking the silver medal at Eurobasket 2009. At the 2010 FIBA World Cup, after narrowly defeating Croatia in the Round of 16, Miloš Teodosić hit a deep three-point shot to upset the favourites of the tournament Spain in the quarter-finals. Entering the semis, Serbia would come up short, after a controversial referee's error to the tournament's host Turkey 83–82. With the youngest team in the competition, Serbia eventually finished in fourth place after losing to Lithuania 99–88 in the bronze-medal game.

At the EuroBasket 2011, the team failed to reach the semi-finals, finishing the tournament in eighth place; thus failing to qualify for the 2012 Summer Olympics. At the EuroBasket 2013, the team was once again eliminated in the quarter-finals and finished in seventh place.

2014–2019: Silver generation

Following the EuroBasket 2013, Ivković stepped away from the position, and Serbian basketball hall of famer Aleksandar Đorđević stepped into his place.

Đorđević led the team to the silver medal at the 2014 FIBA World Cup, where they lost in the final to the United States. At the EuroBasket 2015, Serbia finished in fourth place, with their only tournament loses coming in the semi-finals to Lithuania and in the bronze-medal game to France.

After winning the 2016 Olympic Qualifying Tournament held in Belgrade, the national team won the silver medal at the 2016 Summer Olympics in Rio de Janeiro, losing in the final to the United States.

With the absence of team captains Miloš Teodosić, and Nikola Jokić, rising star Bogdan Bogdanović emerged as team leader at the EuroBasket 2017. The national team went on to earn their third silver medal in four years, after falling to a Goran Dragić-led Slovenia 93–85 in the final.

Facing a different qualification system introduced by FIBA for the 2019 FIBA World Cup, the national team was forced to play without their key  players in nearly all of their qualification matches. However, they narrowly secured the last spot for the World Cup in their second round qualification group. Prior the World Cup, Serbia was dubbed as one of the favourites to win the tournament; but was eventually defeated in the quarter-finals by Argentina. With the team relegated to the classification phase, they would pick up wins against the United States and Czech Republic to finish in fifth place. After the tournament, head coach Đorđević announced his decision to leave the position after six years.

2021–present: Recent tournaments
Under new head coach Igor Kokoškov, Serbia failed to qualify to the 2020 Summer Olympics after losing in the final game of the Qualifying Tournament to Italy before home crowd. At the EuroBasket 2022, led by legendary head coach Svetislav Pešić, after winning all five group matches, Italy upset Serbia in Round of 16 with 94–86 and Serbia finished in ninth place.

Honours

Medals table

Competitive record

Name of the nation during the tournaments:
 FR Yugoslavia / Serbia and Montenegro 1992–2006
 Serbia 2007–present

FIBA World Cup

Olympic Games

EuroBasket

Results and fixtures

2022

2023

Team

Current roster
Roster for the EuroBasket 2022.

Depth chart

Depth chart 2023

Past rosters

EuroBasket 1995
EuroBasket 1997
EuroBasket 1999
EuroBasket 2001
EuroBasket 2003
EuroBasket 2005
EuroBasket 2007
EuroBasket 2009
EuroBasket 2011
EuroBasket 2013
EuroBasket 2015
EuroBasket 2017
EuroBasket 2022

1998 FIBA World Cup
2002 FIBA World Cup
2006 FIBA World Cup
2010 FIBA World Cup
2014 FIBA World Cup
2019 FIBA World Cup

1996 Summer Olympics
2000 Summer Olympics
2004 Summer Olympics
2016 Summer Olympics

Head coaches
Since 1992, the national team was managed by a total of eight different head coaches. Dušan Ivković, Željko Obradović, and Svetislav Pešić are the only coaches with more than one spell.

FR Yugoslavia

Serbia and Montenegro

Serbia

Player statistics
These tables include player statistics on Olympic games, FIBA World Cup and FIBA Eurobasket matches since 1995.
Bold denotes players still playing international basketball.

Most capped players

Top scorers

Notable players

Multiple medal winners
This is a list of people who have won two or more medals, who represented FR Yugoslavia / Serbia and Montenegro or Serbia since 1995.

People in bold are still active competitors
 Montenegrin players from period 1995–2005 are not included, such as Vlado Šćepanović, Predrag Drobnjak and Nikola Bulatović.

Individual awards

International competitions
 FIBA World Cup MVP
 Dejan Bodiroga – 1998
 FIBA World Cup All-Tournament Team
 Dejan Bodiroga – 1998
 Željko Rebrača – 1998
 Peja Stojaković – 2002
 Miloš Teodosić – 2010, 2014
 Bogdan Bogdanović – 2019
 FIBA World Cup Top Scorer – by total points
 Bogdan Bogdanović – 2019
 EuroBasket MVP
 Aleksandar Đorđević – 1997
 Peja Stojaković – 2001
 EuroBasket All-Tournament Team
 Vlade Divac – 1995
 Aleksandar Đorđević – 1997
 Željko Rebrača – 1997
 Dejan Bodiroga – 1997, 1999
 Peja Stojaković – 2001
 Miloš Teodosić – 2009
 Bogdan Bogdanović – 2017
 EuroBasket Assists Leader
 Miloš Teodosić – 2009, 2011

Other notable achievements 
 FIBA Hall of Fame
 Vlade Divac 
 Naismith Memorial Basketball Hall of Fame
 Dražen Dalipagić
 Vlade Divac 
 Euroscar
 Peja Stojaković – 2001
 Miloš Teodosić – 2016
 Mr. Europa
 Aleksandar Đorđević – 1994, 1995
 Predrag Danilović – 1998
 Peja Stojaković – 2001, 2002
 FIBA Europe Men's Player of the Year Award
 Miloš Teodosić – 2010
 NBA Most Valuable Player
 Nikola Jokić – 2021, 2022
 All-NBA First Team
 Nikola Jokić – 2019, 2021, 2022
 All-NBA Second Team
 Peja Stojaković – 2004
 Nikola Jokić – 2020
 NBA All-Stars
 Vlade Divac – 2001
 Peja Stojaković – 2002, 2003, 2004
 Nikola Jokić – 2019, 2020, 2021, 2022, 2023
 NBA champion
 Darko Miličić – 2004
 Peja Stojaković – 2011
 Ognjen Kuzmić – 2015
 Nemanja Bjelica – 2022
 NBA All-Rookie First Team
 Vlade Divac – 1990
 Nikola Jokić – 2016
 NBA All-Rookie Second Team
  Bogdan Bogdanović – 2018
 NBA 3-Point Shootout champion
 Peja Stojaković – 2002, 2003
 J. Walter Kennedy Citizenship Award 
 Vlade Divac – 2000
 EuroLeague MVP
 Miloš Teodosić – 2010
 Nemanja Bjelica – 2015
 Vasilije Micić – 2021
 EuroLeague Final Four MVP
 Predrag Danilović – 1992 
 Žarko Paspalj – 1994
 Zoran Savić – 1998
 Željko Rebrača – 2000
 Dejan Bodiroga – 2002, 2003
 Vasilije Micić – 2021, 2022
 EuroLeague Top Scorer
 Predrag Danilović – 1992, 1995
 Peja Stojaković – 1998
 Miloš Vujanić – 2003
 Igor Rakočević – 2007, 2009, 2011
 Vasilije Micić – 2022
 EuroLeague Basketball All-Decade Team
 Dejan Bodiroga – 2010
 Bogdan Bogdanović – 2020
 Miloš Teodosić – 2020
50 Greatest EuroLeague Contributors (2008)
 Vlade Divac
 Aleksandar Đorđević
 Predrag Danilović 
 Dejan Bodiroga

Notable coaches

Individual achievements 
 FIBA Hall of Fame
 Dušan Ivković 
 Zoran Slavnić (as player)
 Svetislav Pešić
 NBA All-Star Game
 Igor Kokoškov – 2004
 NBA–winning assistant coach
 Igor Kokoškov – 2004
EuroLeague Basketball Legend Award
 Dušan Ivković 
50 Greatest EuroLeague Contributors (2008)
 Dušan Ivković
 Željko Obradović
Alexander Gomelsky EuroLeague Coach of the Year
 Željko Obradović – 2007, 2011, 2017
 Duško Vujošević – 2009
 Dušan Ivković – 2012
EuroLeague-winning head coach
 Željko Obradović – 1992, 1994, 1995, 2000, 2002, 2007, 2009, 2011, 2017
 Dušan Ivković – 1997, 2012
 Božidar Maljković – 1993, 1996
 Svetislav Pešić – 2003
Triple Crown
 Željko Obradović – 1992, 2007
 Dušan Ivković – 1997
 Svetislav Pešić – 2003

See also

 Serbia men's national under-20 basketball team
 Serbia men's national under-19 basketball team
 Serbia men's national under-18 basketball team
 Serbia men's national under-17 basketball team
 Serbia men's national under-16 basketball team

References

External links

 
Serbia FIBA profile 
Serbia National Team – Men at Eurobasket.com
Serbia Basketball Records at FIBA Archive

 
FIBA EuroBasket-winning countries
Men's national basketball teams
Men's sport in Serbia